Grudge Records was the Australian record label for Universal Music Australia that mostly promoted Australian rock artists, such as Grinspoon, Skunkhour, and Powderfinger. Other artists include H-Block 101 and Sean Ikin.

Grudgefest
Grudgefest was a free all ages, non-alcohol event held at Prince Alfred Park in Sydney on 27 September 1997 and organised by Universal Music Australia and Grudge Records. Acts included Bush, Veruca Salt, Bloodhound Gang and Grinspoon. Approximately 20,000 people attended with all money raised at the concert going to the Sydney City Mission to assist homeless people in Australia.

Artists

The following is a list of artists who have had releases issued by Grudge Records:
 Beasts of Bourbon
 Cactus Child
 The Clouds
 The Cruel Sea
 Dave Graney 'n' the Coral Snakes
 Grinspoon 
 H-Block 101 
 Killer Dwarfs (Stand Tall)
 Sean Ikin
 Tex Perkins
 Powderfinger 
 The Screaming Jets
 Spiderbait
 Skunkhour
 Tumbleweed

References

Record labels established in 1996
Record labels based in Sydney